Ascaptesyle is a genus of moths in the subfamily Arctiinae.

Species
 Ascaptesyle purpurascens Rothschild, 1913
 Ascaptesyle submarginata Schaus, 1905

References

Natural History Museum Lepidoptera generic names catalog

Lithosiini
Moth genera